The Story of Joseph and His Brethren (Italian: Giuseppe venduto dai fratelli) is a 1961 Yugoslavian/Italian film directed by Irving Rapper and Luciano Ricci.

The film is also known as Joseph Sold by His Brothers, Joseph and His Brethren (American DVD box title) and Sold into Egypt in the United Kingdom.

It was the last film of Belinda Lee.

Plot summary 
Joseph lives in the land of Canaan, where he is the favorite of his father Jacob's 12 sons. Joseph's brothers envy his favored position in the family and his uncanny ability to interpret people's dreams. When Jacob assigns Joseph to take a flock of sheep to sell, the brothers see their opportunity to be rid of him forever. They beat him and sell him to a slave trader. They then return to Jacob and tell him Joseph has been killed by a wild animal.

Joseph is bought by Potiphar, the pharaoh's superintendent of prisons. Potiphar's wife Henet is strongly attracted to Joseph and tries to seduce him. When he refuses, she falsely accuses him of attempting to rape her, and Joseph is thrown into prison. Later, when Potiphar learns what Henet has done, he kills her and then himself.

Joseph is joined in prison by the Pharaoh's butler and baker, who have fallen out of favor. The two have been plagued by dreams, which Joseph interprets correctly. When the Pharaoh himself has a dream he cannot decipher, his newly reinstated butler suggests he consult Joseph. Joseph interprets the dream to mean that Egypt will enjoy seven years of prosperity, followed by seven years of famine. Joseph suggests setting aside grain from the seven prosperous years in preparation for the famine. Pharaoh accepts the suggestion and appoints Joseph to take charge of the task.

Over the next several years, Joseph's power continues to grow. He marries a woman named Asenath and fends off an attack from the King of Syria. When the famine begins, Egypt has stored enough grain for itself, as well as some to sell to neighboring nations. When Joseph's family back in Canaan travel to Egypt to buy grain, his brothers fail to recognize him and Joseph shrewdly uses this to his advantage. He holds his brother Simeon (son of Jacob) hostage and orders the others to bring Jacob and Benjamin. Joseph reveals his identity and forgives his brothers.

Cast 

Geoffrey Horne as Joseph
Robert Morley as Potiphar
Belinda Lee as Henet
Vira Silenti as Asenath
Terence Hill as Benjamin
Carlo Giustini as Reuben
Finlay Currie as Jacob
Arturo Dominici as Rekmira
Robert Rietti as Pharaoh
Julian Brooks as Chief Baker
Mimo Billi as Chief Butler
Carlo Angeletti ("Marietto") as Benjamin as a Child
Marco Guglielmi as Judah
Dante DiPaolo as Simeon
Charles Borromel as Dan
Helmuth Schneider as Zebulon
Loris Bazzocchi as Issachar
Marin Marija as Asher
Nino Segurini as Gad
Tonko Sarcevic as Levi

Production
Columbia Pictures had intended to make a film with this title for several years starring Thomas Mann starring Rita Hayworth but it never came to fruition.

It was one of two films Rapper directed in Italy, the other being Pontius Pilate. Actors were signed in November 1960 and filming took place in Rome. 

Robert Morley was cast in a lead role. He wrote about his experiences making the film in an article saying:
The Bible belt is a trade term for films of a biblical nature made in and around Rome by Italian producers. It is their pleasant custom to engage senior British actors to play the more mature prophets and aging kings while casting young and virile Americans in the more saintly roles of John the Baptist, Joseph or St Francis of Assissi. The female roles are divided between Belinda Lee and Yvonne Furneaux, depending upon which of them gets back from the Venice Film Festival in time.
Morley set fire to Belinda Lee's wig in one scene but says she was unharmed.

Lee died in a car crash in the US on 15 March 1961.

Reception
The New York Times called it "the clumsiest, the silliest, the worst of the quasi Bible stories to come along since wide screen was born... if you go see it, be prepared to howl."

The Monthly Film Bulletin called it "sedate and extremely prosaic."

The Daily Mail reviewing Joseph in 1964 said Robert Morely put a stern face on a monstrous piece of miscasting" and "we come away sadly reflecting that properly handled, which she so rarely was, Belinda Lee might have been groomed into some kind of English Loren."

References

External links 

The Story of Joseph and His Brethren'' at TCMDB
Film page at BFI

1961 films
Yugoslav drama films
1961 drama films
1960s English-language films
CinemaScope films
English-language Italian films
English-language Yugoslav films
1960s Italian-language films
Films scored by Mario Nascimbene
Cultural depictions of Joseph (Genesis)
1962 drama films
1962 films
1960s multilingual films
Italian multilingual films
Yugoslav multilingual films